Angelika Grieser (born 14 July 1959) is a German former swimmer. She competed in three events at the 1976 Summer Olympics.

References

External links
 

1959 births
Living people
German female backstroke swimmers
Olympic swimmers of West Germany
Swimmers at the 1976 Summer Olympics
People from Schwäbisch Gmünd
Sportspeople from Stuttgart (region)
World Aquatics Championships medalists in swimming
European Aquatics Championships medalists in swimming